The 2008 Futsal Mundialito was an international friendly championship in futsal. The tournament was held in Algarve, Portugal from 2 to 6 of July 2008. The championship was played in Praia da Alagoa.

Tournament

1st round

Group A

Standing

Matches

Group B

Standing

Matches

Knockout stage

5th & 6th Places

Honors 

Best Player: Pedro Costa - 
Best Goalkeeper: Mohammed Al-Sharif - 
Top Goal Scorer: Arione Coelho - 
Fair-Play Team:

Sources 
Futsal Planet

Futsal Mundialito
International futsal competitions hosted by Portugal
Futsal Mundialito, 2008
Futsal